The 2008 congressional elections in Pennsylvania was held on November 4, 2008 to determine who will represent the state of Pennsylvania in the United States House of Representatives.  Pennsylvania has 19 seats in the House, apportioned according to the 2000 United States Census.   Representatives are elected for two-year terms; those elected will serve in the 111th Congress from January 4, 2009 until January 3, 2011.  The election coincides with the 2008 U.S. presidential election.

District 3 was the only seat which changed party (from Republican to Democratic), although CQ Politics had forecasted districts 3, 4, 6, 8, 10, 11, 15 and 18 to be at some risk for the incumbent party.

Match-up summary

District 1

Five-term incumbent Bob Brady (D) ran for another term after losing his bid to be mayor of Philadelphia. He was challenged by businessman Mike Muhammad (R). This race was viewed as noncompetitive, as it took place in heavily Democratic Philadelphia. Brady ran unopposed in 2006 and has generally received over 80% of the vote in his campaigns. CQ Politics had forecast the race as 'Safe Democrat'.  Brady defeated Muhammed by a nearly 10 to 1 margin, winning 242,799 to 24,714, or 90.8% to 9.2%.
Race ranking and details from CQ Politics
Campaign contributions from OpenSecrets

District 2

Seven term incumbent Chaka Fattah (D), who was unsuccessful in his bid to be mayor of Philadelphia, ran without major party opposition. Liberal Republican law professor Michael Livington won the Republican primary, but dropped out of the race due to lack of funding.  He was replaced by Adam Lang. This seat is contained in one of the most Democratic districts in the country, with Democrats often winning 90% of the vote. In 2006, Fattah was elected with 88.6% support and in 2008 he won with 88.9% of the vote. CQ Politics forecasted the race as 'Safe Democrat'.
Race ranking and details from CQ Politics
Campaign contributions from OpenSecrets

District 3

Seven-term Republican incumbent Phil English faced Democrat Kathy Dahlkemper (campaign website), director of the Erie Arboretum. Steven Porter, the 2006 Democratic nominee, is running as an independent. CQ Politics forecasts the race as 'No Clear Favorite'.

English was tested in 2008.  He represented a politically balanced Erie-based district that gave George W. Bush 53% of the vote. Also, in 2006, he received just 54% of the vote against an under-funded candidate with no political experience. He has, however, been able to remain a level of popularity due to a moderate voting record and close ties to organized labor.

The DCCC recruited Erie County Councilman Kyle Foust as its top choice to run against English. Dahlkemper, Attorney Tom Meyers, and religious nonprofit program coordinator Mike Waltner also declared for the Democratic primary. Dahlkemper proved better at mobilizing support than Foust, the original front runner, and won the Democratic nomination with 45% of the vote.

Dahlkemper defeated English 146,846 to 139,787 or 51.2% to 48.8% to capture the seat.  It was the only seat in Pennsylvania to change parties in 2008.
Race ranking and details from CQ Politics
Campaign contributions from OpenSecrets
English (R-i) vs Dahlkemper (D) graph of collected poll results from Pollster.com

District 4

Democratic incumbent Jason Altmire again faced Republican Melissa Hart. CQ Politics forecasted the race as 'Leans Democratic'.

In 2006, Altmire defeated incumbent Hart in a 52% to 48% upset. Hart had won 63% of the vote in 2004, when George W. Bush carried this suburban Pittsburgh district with 53%. In 2006, Pennsylvania was perhaps the most disastrous state for incumbent GOP House members, who lost four seats here. Hart ran unopposed for the Republican nomination in 2008 and attempted to use her public service credentials to regain her seat. She previously gained a reputation for appealing to moderate voters despite a conservative track record.  She again lost to Altmire, this time by a wider margin than two years prior, with a 56–44% vote.

Altmire maintained close ties with organized labor, possessed experience with the health care issues that are important in a region with an older population, and was supported by the NRA.
Race ranking and details from CQ Politics
Campaign contributions from OpenSecrets

District 5

Democrat Mark McCracken, Clearfield County commissioner is running against Republican and Centre County GOP chair Glenn "G.T." Thompson in this open seat election. James Fryman represented the Libertarian Party. CQ Politics forecasted this largely rural district as 'Safe Republican'.

Republican John Peterson announced his intention to retire on January 3, 2007, paving the way for a contentious open seat election. Nine Republicans were in the race for the nomination. Four men emerged as top tier candidates: Thompson, hotel developer Matt Shaner, financial consultant Derek Walker, and former Woodland Township supervisor Jeff Strohmann. Also on the Republican ballot were mortgage broker John Kupa, Clarion mayor John Stroup, Elk County coroner Lou Radkowski, former Centre County commissioner Chris Exarchos, and minister Keith Richardson. Thompson won this hard-fought 9-way primary with just 19% of the vote, in large part due to the late endorsement of Peterson who got involved in the primary campaign 10 days prior to election day. Walker and Shaner proved to be superior fundraisers and aired numerous television and radio commercials to counter Peterson's endorsement of Thompson. The Republican primary included many personal attacks, with Shaner targeting Walker as being political incompetent and Walker referring to a DUI incident involving Shaner. Walker and Thompson were very close in the polls on Election Day, but Thompson received a late boost because of his political track record in Centre County, the district's population center.

McCracken, Lock Haven mayor Richard Vilello, and Bill Cahir, a journalist and Marine Corps veteran of the Iraq War, battled for the Democratic nomination. McCracken won 40% in a hard-fought Democratic race that received much less attention.

Despite presenting an open seat opportunity, this race was always viewed as safe for the Republicans, who have generally won over 65% in this district. Prior to 2006, Peterson had previously run in three straight elections without Democratic opposition.

Thompson won with 56.7% of the vote (155,513 votes) to 41.0% for McCracken (112,509).  Fryman garnered 6,155 voted or 2.2%.
Race ranking and details from CQ Politics
Campaign contributions from OpenSecrets

District 6

Three term Republican Jim Gerlach faced Democrat Bob Roggio (campaign website), a retired businessman from Charlestown who ran unopposed for the Democratic nomination both of his opponents dropped out of the race. CQ Politics forecasts the race as 'Republican Favored'.

Gerlach has become used to winning close elections, having survived threats from governor's assistant (and son of the former US Senator) Dan Wofford and attorney Lois Murphy in 2004 and 2006 with approximately 51% each year. The district is a classic swing district that went to John Kerry with 51% in 2004. However, Roggio did not have the name recognition nor the funding that Murphy had when waging her campaign, which made his candidacy more difficult than past challengers.

However, due to the tough environment in 2008 for Republicans, and the fact that Democrats outnumber Republicans this year for the first time in this district, the race was close. In addition, Gerlach has had some trouble shaking a connection to ousted Republican leader Tom Delay, who provided contributions to Gerlach through his PAC.

However, Gerlach has a relatively moderate voting record and is seen as a tough campaigner who is knowledgeable in the suburban issues that are important in his district.

Gerlach once again held on and won the election 179,423 (52.1%) to 164,952 (47.9%).
Race ranking and details from CQ Politics
Campaign contributions from OpenSecrets
Gerlach (R-i) vs Roggio (D) graph of collected poll results from Pollster.com

District 7

Incumbent Democratic nominee Joe Sestak defeated Republican nominee Wendell Craig Williams, winning 59.6% of the vote.
In 2006 Sestak defeated incumbent Curt Weldon, who was being investigated for misuse of campaign funds, by 56% to 44%. Sestak used his military credentials as a retired vice admiral to present himself as a strong leader and as an ethical alternative to a Republican Party that has faced scandal within his district. Because of his moderate voting record, reputation as a tireless worker, and military background, Sestak was expected to have a large advantage over any Republican opponent in 2008. The NRCC initially had trouble finding any top-tier candidates, and eventually settled on Iraq War veteran and attorney Craig Williams.   
Campaign contributions from OpenSecrets

District 8

Democratic incumbent Patrick Murphy, an Iraq War veteran, won against Republican nominee Tom Manion, a businessman and retired Marine, and Independent Tom Lingenfelter. CQ Politics forecasts the race as 'Democrat Favored'.

Murphy narrowly won in 2006, when he unseated one-term Republican Mike Fitzpatrick by 1,518 votes. Manion, a retired Marine Colonel and executive at Johnson and Johnson, ran unopposed in the Republican primary in April. Significant national attention has been drawn to the race because of the Iraq War connections of both candidates. Murphy is a veteran and a strong critic of the war, while Manion, whose son 1stLt Travis Manion was killed in Iraq in April 2007, supports the war.

This district contains Bucks County and a small part of Northern Philadelphia and Montgomery County. Once considered a safe Republican district, it has recently been trending more Democratic. Registered Democrats narrowly outnumber registered Republicans as of August 2008, due in large part to voter registration drives connected with the Democratic presidential primary in Pennsylvania.
Race ranking and details from CQ Politics
Campaign contributions from OpenSecrets

District 9

Three term Bill Shuster (R) won re-election with 64% of the vote. Shuster won 60.3% of the vote in 2006; George W. Bush carried the district with over 67% in 2004. Shuster also held the advantage of name recognition, as he is the son of a powerful congressman. The district is also the most Republican in Pennsylvania, further giving Shuster an advantage. His Democratic opponent was again 2006 candidate educator Tony Barr (campaign website). CQ Politics forecasts the race as 'Safe Republican'.
Race ranking and details from CQ Politics
Campaign contributions from OpenSecrets

District 10

Democratic incumbent Chris Carney defeated Republican staffing company executive Chris Hackett by a margin of 56% to 44%. CQ Politics forecasted the race as 'Leans Democratic' prior to Carney's victory. The win on the part of the Democratic congressman coincided with John McCain winning 54 percent of the vote in the district as opposed to Democrat Barack Obama's 46 percent.

Carney was initially thought to have been facing a difficult reelection bid in this heavily Republican district, which he won after widely publicized allegations of incumbent Republican Don Sherwood’s extramarital affair with and alleged abuse of Cynthia Ore. Carney defeated Sherwood 53% to 47%. However, President George W. Bush won the 10th District 60% to 40% in 2004.

Two Republicans fought for the nomination: staffing company executive Chris Hackett, who gained the endorsement of conservative organizations and manufacturing executive Dan Meuser, who has credibility as a disabled rights activist. While battling for the nomination, Meuser accused Hackett of wavering on his pro-life stance, while Hackett painted Meuser as associated with unpopular politicians. Hackett won a tough primary with 52% of the vote, which drained many of his resources for the general election.

Carney, throughout the general election, was the favorite to retain his seat but the vote was expected to be somewhat close. The traditionally Republican leanings of the district were advantageous for Hackett, but Pennsylvania as a whole has been trending Democratic recently, having voted for the Democratic nominee for President in every election since 1992. The state ultimately backed Obama that year by a ten-point margin. Carney also has a strong military background and used his membership in the Blue Dog Coalition, a group of moderate Democrats that promote compromise, as a boost.

Carney easily beat Hackett by a twelve-point margin and was aided by a stronger than anticipated vote for the national Democratic presidential ticket in the district. Whereas John Kerry and John Edwards in 2004 received merely 40 percent of the vote in the 10th district, Barack Obama and Joe Biden received 46 percent of the vote. 
Race ranking and details from CQ Politics
Campaign contributions from OpenSecrets
Hackett (R) vs Carney (D-i) graph of collected poll results from Pollster.com

District 11

Twelve term Democratic incumbent Paul Kanjorski (D) was challenged by Republican Lou Barletta, the mayor of Hazleton. CQ Politics forecast the race as 'No Clear Favorite'.

Kanjorksi generally won reelection easily, considering the Democratic leanings of the district. John Kerry won this district in 2004 with 52% and Kanjorski was reelected with 72.5% of the vote in 2006. However, he faced one of the toughest elections of his career against Barletta, a figure who made the national spotlight for the anti-illegal immigration policies he promoted as mayor. He was unopposed for the Republican nomination and has national name recognition for his stance which may have helped or hurt him with different voting groups in the election. Kanjorksi came under scrutiny for several comments he has made during the recent Congress, including his quote that the Democrats stretched the facts on the Iraq War to provide a bigger advantage during the 2006 election cycle.

Kanjorski edged out Lou Barletta by fewer than 10,000 votes, 51.6% to 48.4%. 
Race ranking and details from CQ Politics
Campaign contributions from OpenSecrets
Barletta (R) vs Kanjorski (D-i) graph of collected poll results from Pollster.com

District 12

Sixteen term incumbent John Murtha (D) ran against Retired Lieutenant Colonel William Russell (R), who won the Republican nomination after staging a successful write-in campaign. CQ Politics forecasts the race as 'Safe Democrat,' but the race tightened after Murtha made well-publicized comments referring to Western Pennsylvania as a "racist" and "redneck" area. Murtha's comments were spoofed in the October 25, 2008 episode of Saturday Night Live in a segment entitled "Sen. Biden and  Rep. Murtha Say Crazy Things in Johnstown, Pa." By October, Russell out-raised and outspent Murtha for a whole week. Nevertheless, Murtha secured re-election by a 16-point margin. The district has a Cook Partisan Voting Index score of R +1.
Race ranking and details from CQ Politics
Campaign contributions from OpenSecrets

District 13

While two term Democrat Allyson Schwartz is a target for Republicans in the 2008 race, her seat is expected to be relatively safe. She did not face a serious challenge in 2006 against Raj Bhakta in this Democratic-leaning district. 2007 Philadelphia mayoral candidate Al Taubenberger and state Senator Stewart Greenleaf pondered running on the Republican ticket, but did not enter the race. Attorney Marina Kats ran unopposed for the Republican nomination. Kats is underfunded and without name recognition, while running against and incumbent with a deep warchest of funds, which presents a crucial advantage in an expensive media market. This seat is currently considered to be noncompetitive. CQ Politics forecasts the race as 'Safe Democrat'.
Race ranking and details from CQ Politics
Campaign contributions from OpenSecrets

District 14

Seven term incumbent Mike Doyle (D) will run for another term. For the fourth straight election, Doyle will not face a Republican opponent, although Green Party candidate, professor Titus North, will be on the ballot for the second straight year. Doyle represents a district that gave John Kerry 69% of the vote in 2004 and his seat is considered to be noncompetitive. The congressman presents a strongly pro-union image, while avoiding hot button social issues, which allows him to remain popular and noncontroversial. CQ Politics forecasts the race as 'Safe Democrat'.
Race ranking and details from CQ Politics
Campaign contributions from OpenSecrets

District 15

Republican incumbent Charlie Dent was challenged by Allentown Democratic Party Chair Sam Bennett. CQ Politics forecast the race as 'Republican Favored'.

Although Dent was targeted by the Democrats for a tough race in 2006, his seat was ultimately relatively safe in 2008. In 2004, he won only 53% of the vote against a political newcomer with no political experience, but did significantly better in his bid for a second term. His district covers the Lehigh Valley region and is politically marginal, narrowly going to John Kerry with 50% of the vote in 2004.

Lehigh County Executive Don Cunningham, and state Democratic Party Chairman T.J. Rooney declined to run for the Democratic nomination, leaving Sam Bennett as the sole member of her party's ticket. Bennett was not considered to be as strong of a candidate as Democrats would like, which helped this seat fall out of contention. Although Democrats have an advantage in registration in the district and that Pennsylvania as a whole is trending Democratic, Dent projects a moderate image. His relationship with popular liberal then-Republican Arlen Specter also aids Dent. 
Race ranking and details from CQ Politics
Campaign contributions from OpenSecrets

District 16

Six-term Republican incumbent Joe Pitts is running for reelection against Democratic nominee Bruce Slater (campaign website),a U.S Navy veteran, historic restoration contractor, democratic committee person and community activist who ran unopposed in the primary. Green Party candidate John Murphy, a management consultant and Constitution Party candidate Dan Frank (campaign website) will also be on the ballot. CQ Politics forecasts the race as 'Safe Republican'.

Pitts had the worst showing of his congressional career in 2008, winning 55.8% of the vote. However, he represents a historically conservative district which gave 61% of its votes to George W. Bush in 2004, and has not attracted a top tier Democratic challenger.  
Race ranking and details from CQ Politics
Campaign contributions from OpenSecrets

District 17

Eight term incumbent Tim Holden (D) is running against Toni Gilhooley (R), a retired Pennsylvania state trooper. CQ Politics forecasts the race as 'Safe Democrat'.

The 17th congressional district gave George W. Bush 58% of its votes and has historically been dominated by Republicans. However, Holden upset the district's 10-term incumbent, George Gekas, in 2002 after being drawn into the district (he'd previously represented a Reading-based district) and hasn't faced substantive opposition since then. He is a member of the moderate Blue Dog Coalition and opposes abortion and gun control. Gilhooley was a conservative candidate. Holden has used his overwhelming support in Schuylkill County, his home county, to make up for past deficits in areas such as Lebanon County and Dauphin County.
Race ranking and details from CQ Politics
Campaign contributions from OpenSecrets

District 18

Three term Republican Tim Murphy was challenged by Democrat  Steve O'Donnell, a Monroeville health care executive. CQ Politics forecasted the race as 'Republican Favored'.

Murphy was reelected in 2006 with 58% of the vote against a little-known Democrat.  He represents a suburban Pittsburgh district that George W. Bush won with 54% of the vote but that has a strong Democratic history. His campaigning skills have yet to be tested, with relatively easy wins in his three elections thus far, and he could be vulnerable.

The DCCC tried to persuade Allegheny County Executive Dan Onorato to run, but he showed no interest in the race. Business consultant Beth Hafer, whose mother Barbara Hafer is a longtime state official, was then expected to be the front runner for the Democratic nomination. Insurance executive Brien Wall and Monroeville health care executive Steve O'Donnell also ran. O'Donnell won an upset victory with 45% of the vote in a somewhat under the radar election. Although O'Donnell should make the race competitive, Murphy has a significant advantage because of name recognition and a moderate image. 
Race ranking and details from CQ Politics
Campaign contributions from OpenSecrets

District 19

Four term incumbent Todd Russell Platts (R) will run for another term. His Democratic opponent will be 2006 candidate and college professor Phil Avillo (campaign website), who was unopposed in the party primary. Platts represents a highly conservative district, which gave 64% of the vote to George W. Bush in 2004. Avillo, meanwhile, has raised very little money for his campaign. This race is expected to be noncompetitive. CQ Politics forecasts the race as 'Safe Republican'.
Race ranking and details from CQ Politics
Campaign contributions from OpenSecrets

References

External links
Bureau of Commissions, Elections and Legislation from the Pennsylvania Department of State
Election Returns
U.S. Congress candidates for Pennsylvania at Project Vote Smart
Pennsylvania U.S. House Races from 2008 Race Tracker
Campaign contributions for Pennsylvania congressional races from OpenSecrets
Candidates for Elections in Pennsylvania

2008
Pennsylvania
United States House of Representatives